Ronald George Bush (3 May 1909 – 10 May 1996) was a New Zealand rugby union player and coach. He played one test match for the All Blacks in 1931 and was coach of the All Blacks in 1962.

Biography
Bush was born in Nelson in 1909 and was educated at Mount Albert Grammar School. He was an uncle of sports photographer Peter Bush.

Bush played his only test match for the All Blacks in 1931 at fullback, although he was versatile and also played as a loose forward, three-quarter and five-eighth.

With Hubert McLean he was one of the founders of the New Zealand Barbarians in 1937; their first game was against Auckland in 1938. Bush was the All Blacks coach in 1962.

He was also a cricketer who played 10 first-class matches for the Auckland cricket team between 1932 and 1937.

He died in Auckland in 1996.

See also
 List of Auckland representative cricketers

References

 

1909 births
1996 deaths
New Zealand international rugby union players
New Zealand national rugby union team coaches
Auckland rugby union players
Otago rugby union players
Auckland cricketers
New Zealand cricketers
New Zealand rugby union players
People educated at Mount Albert Grammar School